Kundong University, sometimes called Andong Info Tech or AIT,  was a small technical college located in Andong City, North Gyeongsang province, South Korea. In July 2012 now-Ministry of Education granted voluntary closure of the university upon the request filed in May 2012. The university officially closed in August 2012.  

It offered degree programs in fields such architecture, animation, herbal medicine, and civil engineering.  Facilities included broadcast studios and a library of around 18,500 volumes. International sister institutions included the Canadian Malaspina University-College and the American University of Montana and Wenatchee Valley College.

History
The foundation which would establish the school was founded in 1972.  In  1987, governmental permission to found a school was received, and in 1992 the school actually opened as Andong Industrial Technical College.  The first entering class of 480 students was admitted on March 4, 1993.  The entering class of 2003 numbered 842 students.  The school took on its current name in 1998. From 2006, the name was Kundong University. The university closed in August, 2012

See also
List of colleges and universities in South Korea
Education in South Korea

External links
Kundong University website
Ministry of Education and Human Resources Development page on Andong Info Tech

References 

Defunct universities and colleges in South Korea
Andong
1992 establishments in South Korea
Educational institutions established in 1992